The virus counter is an instrument for rapid quantification of viruses in liquid samples. It is a specialized flow cytometer that uses high-sensitivity fluorescence detection to give a direct measurement of the concentration of virus particles in a fraction of the time required for traditional plaque assays.

Early development
The virus counter was developed in 2001 at University of Colorado Boulder. The Single Nanometric Particle Enumerator (SNaPE) instrument was based on the principle of fluorescence detection from single stained nucleic acids aggregates by evaluating respiratory viruses. Quantification results from the instrument correlated with expected virus concentration and the values would be significantly higher than those obtained by standard plaque titer methods typically used for virus quantification. The measured concentrations were similar in magnitude to quantitative PCR results, both being substantially higher than plaque titer values. 

In 2004 the virus counter’s added a second detection channel to the SNaPE instrument which improved data analysis substantially to increase specificity. The principle of detection was based on staining proteins and nucleic acids with fluorescent dyes within a liquid sample. As stained particles passed through the probe region and interacted with a laser, emissions were detected and recorded for analysis. This dual channel system established the concept of measuring intact virions through detection of co-localized protein and nucleic acids. Results from baculovirus analyzed with this dual-channel virus counter system were lower in magnitude than the SNaPE results, being more similar in magnitude and correlated with infectious assay results.

Commercialization
A commercial version of the virus counter was developed by InDevR. In 2012 InDevR spun off the virus counter instrument to ViroCyt LCC. The press release from January 15, 2013 stated, "ViroCyt will be responsible for expanding the commercial market for the virus counter technology developed by InDevR." Sartorius Stedim Biotech acquired ViroCyt for $16 million in 2016. The Virus Analytics department of Sartorius Stedium developed the next generation Virus Counter which is commercially available.

Applications
The instrument is representative of the next generation of “personal” flow cytometers designed exclusively for total virus particle quantification. Similar to virus concentration determined by transmission electron microscopy, the virus counter provides a measurement of the total number of virus particles/mL. The virus counter has been successfully demonstrated to readily quantify a diverse range of viruses including but not limited to: influenza, dengue, baculovirus, respiratory syncytial, parainfluenza, rubella, cytomegalovirus, and herpes simplex virus.

The ability to rapidly quantify viruses has high impact in:
Vaccine research, development, and manufacturing
Antiviral research
Viral vector research and protein expression
Bioprocess optimization
Viral antigen characterization
Viral diagnostic standard characterization
Viral-based gene therapy research

Reagents
Sartorius Stedium has developed several reagents for the Virus Counter since acquiring it in 2016. These reagents include Combodye, a duel stained reagent for enveloped viruses and Virotag, specific fluorescently labeled, high-affinity reagents.

References

External links
InDevR Website
University of Colorado Website

Flow cytometry
Medical tests
University of Colorado
Virology